Amani Lewis (born 1994) is an American artist based in Baltimore, Maryland.

Early life and education 
Lewis grew up in Columbia, Maryland. They earned a BFA from Maryland Institute College of Arts in 2016.

Art career 
In September, 2019, Lewis showed Amani Lewis: Subjective Nature at the August Wilson African American Cultural Center in Pittsburgh, PA. They are interested in social justice and community activism. In 2019, Lewis showed a group show titled: Conjuring Wholeness at De Buck Gallery in New York City. Lewis was an Artist-in-Residence at Fountainhead Residency and Studios in Miami, Florida. In 2020, They were in a group show titled: Black Voices/Black Microcosm at CFHILL Art Space in Stockholm, Sweden curated by Destinee Ross.

References 

Living people
African-American painters
1994 births
American contemporary painters
21st-century African-American people